Nikos Kourkoulos (December 5, 1934 in Athens, Greece – January 30, 2007) was a highly respected Greek theatrical and film performer, one of the most talented and recognizable actors in Greece of modern times. Kourkoulos is best known to Greek audiences for playing "Angelos Kreouzis" in Oratotis miden, but he also appeared in other  movies such as To Homa vaftike kokkino, Exodos kindynou, O Astrapogiannos, O Katiforos among others.

Life and career

Nikos Kourkoulos grew up in the Athens district of Zografou. As young sports and football were his loves. He belonged to Panathinaikos F.C. roster during his school years. Acting came before him rather accidentally. As he himself had claimed, he decided to become an actor after reading books on theatre. 

He studied acting at the National Theatre of Greece's School of Drama, and made his stage debut in a 1958 Athens production of Alexandre Dumas, fils' La dame aux camélias, opposite Ellie Lambeti and Dimitris Horn.

He was one of the founders of the prestigious musical group, 
Proskinio and appeared in the 1967 Broadway musical,
Illya Darling, with Melina Mercouri, in a role for which he was nominated for a Tony award as a best supporting actor.

For most of the 1960s/70s, Kourkoulos' success was unparalleled by any other Greek actor, except Dimitris Papamichael, but Kourkoulos' choice of material was more challenging than the latter's.  He created his personal group in the early 1970s, with a repertory which included, among others, Franz Kafka's The Trial, Arthur Miller's View from the Bridge and Brecht's The Threepenny Opera. His last stage appearance was in the title role of Sophocles' Philoktitis (1991) at the restored ancient theater of Epidaurus in southern Greece. In 1995, he was named as Artistic Director of the National Theatre of Greece, an institution he managed to turn into a profitable organization without compromising on artistic integrity.

His film career was successful: he starred in many films from the late 1950s until the early 1980s. His most commercial films have been melodramas with a social background, like Oratotis miden (Ορατότης Μηδέν) (1970).

He was awarded twice at the Thessaloniki Film Festival with the Best Actor Prize for his performance in Adistaktoi (Αδίστακτοι 1965) and Astrapogiannos (Αστραπόγιαννος 1970). For five (5) years (1975–1980) he was President of the Society of Greek Theatre Actor-Managers.

Nikos Kourkoulos died at the Errikos Dynan Hospital, Athens, on 30 January 2007, after a long battle with cancer, aged 72. He was survived by his companion of twenty years, Marianna Latsi (daughter of Greek shipping billionaire Yiannis Latsis), and four children: Errieta and Philip from his relationship with Marianna Latsis, and Melita and Alkis from his legal marriage.

Theatrical Performances
Nikos Kourkoulos headed companies and his own theatre in Athens and Thessaloniki, and played leading roles in:

Euripides, Medea, 1959
Thornton Wilder, Our Town, 1960
Jean Giraudoux, Ondine, 1962
R & A Goetz, The Heiress, 1962
Samuel A. Taylor, Sabrina Fair, 1963
William Shakespeare, Julius Caesar, 1964
Luigi Pirandello, Clothing The Naked, 1964
Frank Wedekind, Lulu, 1965
Never on a Sunday (Illya Darling), 1967, in the United States (directed by Jules Dassin, with Melina Mercouri, in a production nominated for a Tony award)
Franz Kafka, The Castle, 1964, and The Trial, 1971
Euripides, Orestes, 1971
Sławomir Mrożek, Tango, 1972
Bertholt Brecht, The Threepenny Opera, 1975 (as Macheath, with Melina Mercouri as Jenny), directed by Jules Dassin
Anton Chekhov, The Seagull, 1976
Harold Pinter, The Homecoming, 1977
Jean Anouilh, Ring Round the Moon, 1978
Neil Simon, The Odd Couple, 1980, directed by Andreas Voutsinas
Sophocles, Oedipus the King, 1982
Ugo Betti, Reciprocation, 1983, directed by Minos Volanakis
Arthur Miller, A View from the Bridge, 1986
Dale Wasserman, One Flew Over the Cuckoo’s Nest, 1987
Sophocles, Philoctetes, 1991

Filmography
 To Telefteo psemma 1957, A Matter of Dignity
 Barbayannis, o kanatas 1957, Barbayiannis, the potter
 Erotikes istories 1959, Erotic stories
 Bouboulina 1959
 Amaryllis, to koritsi tis agapis 1959, Amaryllis, the girl of love
 I Kyria dimarhos 1960, Lady mayor
 Kalimera Athina 1960, Goodmorning Athens
 To Hamini 1960, The Guttersnipe
 Dyo hiliades naftes kai ena koritsi 1960, Two thousands  sailors and one girl
 Mana mou, ton agapisa 1961, Mother, I loved him
 O Katiforos 1961, The Slip
 Gia sena tin agapi mou 1961, For you my love
 To Taxidi 1962, The travel
 Orgi 1962, Fury
 Syntrimmia tis zois 1963, Debris of life
 Lola tis Troubas 1964, Lola of Trouba
 Enas megalos erotas 1964, One big love
 Dipsa gia zoi 1963, Thirst for life
 Amfivolies 1964, Doubts
 Games of Desire 1964
 To Homa vaftike kokkino 1965, Blood on the Land
 Adistaktoi 1965, Unhesitating
 Koinonia, ora miden 1966, Society, time zero
 Katigoro tous anthropous 1966, I Blame the people
 Epitafios gia ehthrous kaí filous 1966, Epitaph for enemies and for friends
 Kataskopoi sto Saroniko 1968, Agents on Saronic (Gulf)
 Gymnoi sto dromo 1968, Nudes on the street
 Roma come Chicago 1968
 Oratotis miden 1970, Visibility Zero
 O Astrapogiannos 1970
 Katahrisis exousias 1971, Αbuse of Power
 Me fovo kai me pathos 1972, With fear and with passion
 O Ehthros tou laou 1972, The Enemy of people
 Thema syneidiseos 1973, Issue of conscience
 I Diki ton dikaston 1974, The Trial of judgemen
 Ena gelasto apogevma 1979, One happy afternoon
 Exodos kindynou 1980, Exit of danger
 To Fragma 1982, The Dam
 To 13o Kivotio 1992,  The 13th  Kit (TV Series)

References

External links

1934 births
2007 deaths
Greek male stage actors
Greek male film actors
Greek male television actors
Male actors from Athens
Deaths from cancer in Greece